Pilotfish is a multidisciplinary design and innovation consultancy with offices in Amsterdam, Berlin, and Taipei. The company is specialized in industrial design, user interface design, and mechanical engineering. The company covers the entire product development process from research and strategy to ideation, design, engineering, sourcing, tooling, and production.

Evolution

Pilotfish was founded in Munich, Germany, and Taipei, Taiwan, in 2000 by industrial designers Harm Hogenbirk and Marc Nagel. In 2009, a third office was opened in Amsterdam, The Netherlands. The firm employs more than 40 people across its three offices. The company's management speaks regularly at design and business conferences and takes part in international design juries.

Design and Clients

Pilotfish services clients in consumer and professional electronics, medical, automotive and home automation industries. 
Notable projects are the interactive information system Munich Airport InfoGate, the music editing phone Ondo, the multitouch phone Onyx, the communications docking station for the iPhone iFusion SmartStation, the DJ controller system Traktor Kontrol S4, the service robot ITRI Roppie, the digital hearing system Hansaton VELVET X-Mini, and the intelligent patient monitoring platform Pulsion PulsioFlex.

Major clients (as of 2013) include Acer, ASUS, BMW,  MINI, Dell, Bosch, Hansaton, Heineken, Honeywell, ITRI, Logitech, Mastervolt, Munich Airport, Native Instruments, Samsung, Siemens.

Awards

Pilotfish’ work has been awarded with international design awards, including the Good Design Awards, IDEA, iF and red dot awards.

References

Industrial design firms
Companies based in Amsterdam
Companies based in Munich
Companies based in Taipei
Companies established in 2000